Henry Luther Dickey (October 29, 1832 – May 23, 1910) was a U.S. Representative from Ohio for two terms from 1877 to 1881.

Biography 
Born in South Salem, Ohio, Dickey moved with his parents to Washington Court House, Ohio, in 1836.
He moved to Greenfield, Ohio, in 1847.
He attended Greenfield Academy.
He pursued the vocation of civil engineer, and in that capacity had charge of the construction of the Marietta and Cincinnati Railroad in Vinton County, Ohio.
He resigned in 1855.
He studied law.
He was admitted to the bar at Chillicothe, Ohio, in 1857.
He was graduated from the Cincinnati Law School in 1859.
He commenced practice in Greenfield.
He served as member of the State house of representatives in 1861.
He served in the State senate in 1868 and 1869.

Dickey was elected as a Democrat to the Forty-fifth and Forty-sixth Congresses (March 4, 1877 – March 3, 1881).
He was not a candidate for renomination in 1880.
He resumed the practice of law.
He was admitted to practice before the Supreme Court of the United States in 1877.
He served as president of the Commercial Bank of Greenfield.
He died in Greenfield, Ohio, on May 23, 1910.
He was interred in Greenfield Cemetery.

Sources

External links 
 

1832 births
1910 deaths
Democratic Party members of the United States House of Representatives from Ohio
People from Ross County, Ohio
People from Greenfield, Ohio
Democratic Party members of the Ohio House of Representatives
Democratic Party Ohio state senators
Ohio lawyers
University of Cincinnati College of Law alumni
People from Washington Court House, Ohio
19th-century American politicians
19th-century American lawyers